Alain Njoh Njoh Mpondo is a Cameroonian retired footballer who last played for Grants Braes in New Zealand in 2012.

Career

Malaysia

Despite being sent off twice in three games for Telekom Malacca of the Malaysia Super League in 2005, Mpondo was praised by coach Irfan, but was dropped by December that year after the Malaysia Cup, leaving him stranded in Malaysia with only a used return-ticket to the Netherlands.

Vietnam

Suspended for four matches and fined in early 2008 while with CLB Huda Huế, the Cameroonian's penalties were nullified by the Vietnam Football Federation one day later, with Bùi Văn Lâm punished instead. Again, in November, the defender was banned again for four rounds.

New Zealand

A defender for Grants Braes in 2012, Mpondo works for Southern Clams Limited, a fishery based in Dunedin.

References 

Living people
Expatriate footballers in Nigeria
Cameroonian footballers
Expatriate footballers in Vietnam
V.League 1 players
Expatriate footballers in Malaysia
Association football defenders
Lobi Stars F.C. players
Cameroonian expatriate footballers
Malaysia Super League players
Expatriate association footballers in New Zealand
Year of birth missing (living people)